
Year 114 BC was a year of the pre-Julian Roman calendar. At the time it was known as the Year of the Consulship of Balbus and Cato (or, less frequently, year 640 Ab urbe condita) and the Third Year of Yuanding. The denomination 114 BC for this year has been used since the early medieval period, when the Anno Domini calendar era became the prevalent method in Europe for naming years.

Events 
 By place 

 Roman Republic 
 The first temple of Venus is built.

 Asia Minor 
 Mithridates VI Eupator becomes king of Bosporus.

Births 
 Lucius Orbilius Pupillus, Roman grammarian and writer
 Publius Cornelius Lentulus Sura, Roman consul (d. 63 BC)
 Quintus Hortensius, Roman consul and orator (d. 50 BC)

Deaths 
 Zhang Qian, Chinese explorer and diplomat (b. 195 BC)

References